Leading Island is one of the many uninhabited Canadian arctic islands in Qikiqtaaluk Region, Nunavut. It is located at the confluence of Hudson Strait and the Labrador Sea.

It is a member of the Button Islands.

Other islands in the immediate vicinity include Dolphin Island, King Island, Niels Island, and Observation Island.

References 

Islands of Hudson Strait
Islands of the Labrador Sea
Uninhabited islands of Qikiqtaaluk Region